Ashurst is a village and civil parish in the Horsham District of West Sussex, England, about  west of Henfield, and  south of Horsham on the B2135 road. There is a 12th-century parish church dedicated to St James, where local resident Laurence Olivier's funeral was held, as well as a Church of England primary school and a pub, the Fountain Inn.

The parish has a land area of 1009 hectares (2493 acres). In the 2001 census 226 people lived in 97 households, of whom 112 were economically active. At the 2011 Census the population was 279.

References

External links

Ashurst Primary School
St. James' Church

Villages in West Sussex